William Alcock Tully  (14 March 1830 – 26 April 1905) was a Surveyor General of Queensland, (then a colony, now a state of Australia).

Early life
Tully was born in Dublin, Ireland, the son of William Tully, a captain in the Royal Navy, and his wife Mary, née Alcock. He was educated  at Trinity College, Dublin (B.A., 1852). Tully arrived in Hobart, Tasmania aboard the Lord Dalhousie on 14 August 1852.

Career
On 1 May 1853 Tully became a road surveyor, and a third-class surveyor on 1 May 1854 until his resignation in July 1856. Then he was a contract surveyor until 31 December 1858 when he was appointed inspecting surveyor. Tully acted for a while as a gold commissioner and in 1859. He was a foundation member of the Tasmanian Club; in 1860 he married Louisa (died 26 February 1866), granddaughter of Simeon Lord, at Hobart.

In October 1863 (with a glowing reference from James Erskine Calder, Surveyor General of Tasmania) Tully arrived in Queensland as a commissioner of Crown lands in the Kennedy and Warrego pastoral districts. On 16 August 1866 Tully became under-secretary for public lands and chief commissioner of crown lands. Soon afterward he clashed with Sir Augustus Charles Gregory, the Surveyor General of Queensland. On 12 March 1875 Tully became acting Surveyor General replacing Gregory. In 1880 on Tully's advice, the offices of Surveyor General and under-secretary for lands were divided; on 9 July Tully was made Surveyor General and Edward Deshon became under-secretary for lands.

Tully had assisted to draft the Lands Alienation Act (1868) and the Consolidating Crown Lands Alienation Act (1876); as Surveyor General he supervised an expansion of activities, endeavoured to improve standards and enhanced reproduction of Survey Office maps. Tully was appointed to the Land Board on 4 December 1889 and retired on 31 December 1900.

Late life and legacy
Tully had a significant influence on the land laws, procedures and practices of Queensland. The town of Tully in Queensland and the Tully River in northern Queensland were named after him.

References

External links
 Death notice Sydney Morning Herald, 27 April 1905 at Trove, National Library of Australia

External links

1830 births
1905 deaths
Surveyors General of Queensland
Australian surveyors
People from Dublin (city)